Oenus or Oinous (Eth. ) was a town in ancient Laconia, Greece, celebrated for its wine, from which the river Oenus, a tributary of the Eurotas, appears to have derived its name. From its being described by Athenaeus as near Pitane, one of the divisions of ancient Sparta, it was probably situated near the junction of the Oenus and the Eurotas. 

Its site is unlocated.

References

Cities in ancient Peloponnese
Populated places in ancient Laconia
Former populated places in Greece
Lost ancient cities and towns